The Gruenspan (or Grünspan) is a music club in Hamburg, Germany. It  was founded in 1968 as a music club and event centre, in a former movie theatre situated in Grosse Freiheit, next to the Reeperbahn. The club became known for concerts and progressive rock.

The building, situated at a corner, seats 800. Its exterior, painted by Hamburg artists Dieter Glasmacher and Werner Nöfer, was restored in 1995 when the building was overhauled.

In November 1998, it hosted a Rockpalast concert with R.E.M..

External links 
 Homepage of Gruenspan

Nightclubs in Hamburg
Buildings and structures in Hamburg-Mitte
Music venues in Germany
Music in Hamburg
1968 establishments in West Germany
Music venues completed in 1968